Aathmasakhi is a 1952 Indian Malayalam-language drama film directed by G. R. Rao. The film marks the acting debut of Sathyan, who played the lead role along with B. S. Saroja. The film has musical score by Br Lakshmanan.

The film was dubbed into Tamil with the title Priyasakhi and was released on 13 September 1952. Dialogues and lyrics were written by Kambadasan.

Malayalam Cast

Male cast
 Sathyan
 Veeran
 M. N. Nambiar
 K. P. Kottarakkara
 T. S. Muthaiah
 Muthukulam Raghavan Pillai

Female cast
 Ambalappuzha Meenakshi
 B. S. Saroja
 Miss Kumari
 Pankajavalli
 Kumari Thankam
 C. R. Lakshmi
 N. R. Thankam

Tamil Cast
Cast adapted from the song book

Male cast
 Sathyan as Ragu
 Veeran as Zamindar
 M. N. Nambiar as Mohan
 Ramaswami (Friend) as Kuppan
 K. P. Kottarakkarai as Hari
 Kalyanam as Raman
 Muthaiah as Rajan
 Venkitaraman as Doctor

Female cast
 Ambalapuzhai Meenakshi as Kalyani
 B. S. Saroja as Shantha
 Miss Kumari as Leela
 Pankajavalli as Kamalam
 Kumari Thankam as Indira
 C. R. Lakshmi Devi as Lakshmi
 N. R. Thangam as Malathi

References

External links
 

1950s Malayalam-language films
Films scored by Br Lakshmanan